The 1975 WANFL season was the 91st season of senior Australian rules football in Perth and the forty-fifth as the “Western Australian National Football League”. The season saw West Perth, after unexpectedly falling to last in 1974, rise under former  coach Graham Campbell to a remarkable premiership win over South Fremantle by a record 104 points in front of what was then the biggest WANFL crowd on record and has since been only exceeded by the 1979 Grand Final. The Bulldogs, apart from Claremont the least successful WANFL club between 1957 and 1974, rose with arrival of Aboriginal stars Stephen Michael and Maurice Rioli to their first finals appearance in five years and began their greatest era since their golden days of the middle 1950s. With East Perth, revitalised after injuries affected their 1974 campaign, and the inconsistent but at times incomparable Swan Districts, they comprised a top four that remained unchanged
for the final fourteen rounds.

East Fremantle, plagued by injuries to Doug Green and a broken wrist for Brian Peake during the first game against West Perth, falling from premiers to fifth and Perth after a slow start of five consecutive losses from runners-up to sixth. Subiaco fell from fourth to second-last and begun a bleak era with no subsequent finals appearance until 1985, but owing to the loss of Featherby, Robertson and Fitzpatrick to retirement or the VFL, critics generally predicted this before the season. Despite recruiting champion East Perth and Richmond player and coach Mal Brown, Claremont collected their fourteenth and to this date last wooden spoon by an equal-record six clear games, as Brown set a record of fifteen matches suspended during the season – beating another Tiger recruit from East Perth in “Nails” Western forty-three seasons previously.

Home-and-away season

Round 1

Round 2

Round 3

Round 4 (Anzac Day)

Round 5

Round 6

Round 7

Round 8

Round 9 (Foundation Day)

Round 10

Round 11

Round 12

Round 13

Round 14

Round 15

Round 16

Round 17

Round 18

Round 19

Round 20

Round 21

Ladder

Finals

First semi-final

Second semi-final

Preliminary final

Grand Final

Notes
Burton would return briefly in 1976 to help the struggling Lions.

References

External links
Official WAFL website
Western Australian National Football League (WANFL), 1975

West Australian Football League seasons
WANFL